Manouane is an alternative spelling of Manawan,  a First Nations reserve is Quebec, Canada.

Manouane may also refer to:

 Lake Manouane (La Tuque), Quebec
 Manouane River (La Tuque), Quebec

See also
 List of places named Manouane